Adaptive clothing is clothing designed around the needs and abilities of people with varying degrees of disability, including congenital disabilities, acquired disabilities (as the result of an injury, illness or accident) age (elderly people may have trouble with opening and closing buttons)  and temporary disabilities, as well as physical disabilities. Adaptive clothing is influenced by factors such as age, disability type(s), level of independence, mobility, and dexterity, as well as whether a person requires help when dressing, such as from a caregiver. People who struggle with zippers, shoes laces, buttons or even fabrics and texture due to a type of disability may need adaptive clothing. All adaptive clothing was not originally made for people with disabilities but was made simply as a fashion trend of having clothes that were easy to take on and off. Being comfortable in your clothing became more of a fashion trend from the 1950’s-70’s. For example, elastic waistbands and stretchy fabrics.

Despite common misconception, adaptive clothing is utilized by people with a wide range of disabilities, ranging from wheelchair users and people with more visible disabilities to those whose disabilities are not as visible, but still find themselves limited by the construction of typical clothing. Those with autism may experience sensory sensitivities to certain fabrics which is not a visible ailment. There is also a lot of use of adaptive clothing coming from the elderly community and children who may have disabilities as to make it easier to operate their clothing without assistance or to assist caregivers in dressing the user.Adaptive design, a core component of adaptive clothing design and construction, proactively addresses these foreseen limitations by adapting clothing to the user, benefitting both them and caregivers or healthcare professionals to be more efficient, increasing independence, as well as preventing potential back and shoulder injuries. If both functional and fashionable, adaptive clothing can increase an individual’s quality of life and confidence.

Types of adaptions
There are some other adaptations that take place in order to make the clothes as comfortable as possible for these individuals. One being breathability as well as using natural fibers as to not irritate the skin. Another is specialized garment patterns, seams, and closures, for example having outward facing seams in order to not irritate skin or closures that are easily opened and close like magnets. Being able to adjust temperature is important because people with physical disabilities sometimes have different temperature needs than others. Adaptive clothing typically incorporates flat seams to reduce friction, and discreet adaptations that provide an outward appearance as consistent with fashion norms as possible. For example longer inseams in the back of pants as for there to be more coverage for a person bound to a wheelchair. These adaptations may include easy-access snap fasteners and velcro fastenings, fabric that stretches in one or both directions, clothing design with room to accommodate incontinence aids, a longer rise in the back of trousers to accommodate wheelchair users, and an elasticated waist for increased comfort and easier dressing.

Individuals with limited or no dexterity may experience difficulty in manipulating certain fastenings, such as buttons and zippers. For this reason, it is common for adaptive clothing to utilize velcro or magnetic closures in the place of closures that would require more dexterity.

Similarly, disabled people whose mobility limits them from engaging in the typical full range of motion commonly experience difficulty when dressing in clothing that must be pulled up from the feet or pulled over the head; as such, adaptive clothing may feature hidden flap-openings or additional closures that allow the garment itself to be pulled on without having to bend over or reach up. These may take the form of velcro flaps at the neck and shoulders, allowing the neckline to expand when the garment is pulled down over the head. The same adjustments may also be made for shoes and other accessories, with velcro closures being the most common feature in adaptive shoes.

Examples

Magnetic closures 
For individuals with Parkinson's and other disabilities that affect motor skills like dexterity, magnetic closures have emerged as a great solution across multiple garments.

In the past 10–20 years there has been an increase in more well known brands like Tommy Hilfiger and Walmart making clothing that fit to elderly or disabled peoples needs. However, the patent expired in 2018. In 2012, fashion entrepreneur Ian Stikeleather was interviewed about his new, innovative line of modular clothing, which launched on the Kickstarter crowd-funding platform and featured magnetic closures and attachment points. In 2012, Stikeholder had his patent approved for a dress shirt with magnetic closure down the front, at the wrists, and around the collar (where a removable hood would be attached).

Later, Maura Horton, who is often credited with the invention of magnetic closure clothing, would go on to design and patent a similar design to Stikeholder's dress-shirt. Without magnets around the shirt collar, this design was simple enough and different enough from Stikeholder's design to be approved for a patent as well.  In 2018 Salem Blair shared with the public her multiple sclerosis. She said in an interview that she would like to collaborate with a high fashion brand to make fashionable clothes not only for people who need it but also for people who want to be comfortable. Horton then branded and licensed out this design, which became the most commercially successful implementation of magnetic closures in clothing to date. The technology was licensed for numerous lines of adaptive clothing by brands including Van Heusen and MagnaClick. Magnetic closures again came to the forefront of adaptive clothing when Tommy Hilfiger featured magnetic closures prominently in the launch of their adaptive clothing line in the Spring of 2018. Silvert's Adaptive Clothing & Footwear also carry magnetic closure dress shirts for both men and women.

Factors of design 
Clothing is designed with human, environment, and, obviously, clothing in mind. This is called the “Human-Clothing-Enviornment.” These 3 factors contribute to the design of each piece of clothing. The human category is further broken down into subcategories, which includes visible or invisible disabilities and how that affects the user of an article of clothing. Only when all of the “Human-Clothing-Environment” is in equilibrium will the clothing be comfortable, functional, and fashionable for the user.

There is a process by which clothing creators may follow to design more functional clothing articles. The first step is to identify the problem at which they are trying to solve. For example, are there issues with zippers or buttons, or is the user wheelchair-bound? Next the get preliminary ideas. After making initial designs and seeing what works and what doesn’t, creators make design refinements. Finally, it comes time to make a prototype. Once the prototype it done, it will be evaluated for its form and function. If it does not meet the criteria, the design process is repeated, starting where the creator believes the mistakes were first made. At the end of the process, the clothing design can be implemented and used.

References